The Apple Daily was an online newspaper in Taiwan. It was established as a printed paper and was owned by Hong Kong-based Next Digital media group, which printed the eponymous newspaper in Hong Kong from 1995 to 2021. The Media Group experimented on cartoonifying news with the Next Media Animation, provided animated news stories on scandals and crimes in Taiwan, as well as on pop culture in other parts of the world, and gained a huge success. Apple Daily published its last printed edition on 17 May 2021, with its internet-based news site remaining in operation until 31 August 2022.

History
Apple Daily first published on 2 May 2003. It was the first newspaper in Taiwan to publish 365 days a year, and it was the only newspaper in Taiwan subject to the circulation audit from Audit Bureau of Circulations (ROC). Opening the Apple Daily in Taiwan was part of a larger push by parent company Next Media into the Taiwanese market. Next Media brought a combination of celebrity gossip and investigative journalism that was new to the market. Circulation peaked at 700,000. Its approach either inspired or revolted competitors and changed Taiwan’s media landscape.

2012 sale and anti-monopoly campaigns 

In 2012, the Next Media Group withdrew from the Taiwan market and sold its Taiwan operations, including Apple Daily, Sharp Daily, Next Weekly and the Next TV cable network. In 29 November, investors including Want Want China Times group president Tsai Shao-chung, Formosa Plastics Group chairman William Wong and Chinatrust Charity Foundation chairman Jeffrey Koo, Jr, signed a contract with the Next Media Group in Macau. Tsai Shao-chung is the son of Tsai Eng-meng, the chair of the Want Want Group, who owns China Times, one of the largest newspapers in Taiwan, and has acquired 60% of the second largest cable TV services on the island. Tsai Eng-meng had made a controversial comment in an interview with Washington Post, stating that reports about massacre in the Tiananmen Square protest of 1989 were not true. If the Next Media buyout deal were approved by the Taiwan Government, Want Want Group would control nearly 50% of Taiwan's news media. Fearing that Tsai's pro-Beijing position and the media monopoly would hurt media freedom and democracy, protesters campaigned to urge the Taiwan Government cancel the Next Media sale.

2019: Becoming an online service
On 4 April 2019, the Apple Daily became an online newspaper, and began charging a NT$10 monthly subscription fee in September 2019, following a trial period between June and August 2019. 

In 2020, Apple Daily won a SOPA Scoop Award for a 10-month investigation into fraudulent speculation on farmland.

On 14 May 2021, the newspaper announced the discontinuation of their print edition from 18 May 2021. On 30 August 2022, Apple Online announced that the final updates to the website would be rolled out the next day. As Apple Online ceased operations, Singaporean businessman  declared the establishment of Next Apple News, and the hiring of a majority of the Apple Online staff.

See also
 Media of Taiwan

References

External links
  

Defunct newspapers published in Taiwan
Next Digital
2003 establishments in Taiwan
Mass media in Taipei
Publications established in 2003
2022 disestablishments in Taiwan
Chinese-language newspapers (Traditional Chinese)
Publications disestablished in 2021
2021 disestablishments in Taiwan